Teagueia teaguei is a species of orchid endemic to Ecuador.

References

Pleurothallidinae
Orchids of Ecuador
Plants described in 1979